This is a list of youngest birth mothers aged less than 11 years at time of birth (not at time of conception).

List

5 years old

6 years old

8 years old

9 years old

10 years old

See also

Age of consent
Child sexual abuse
Child sexuality
List of child brides
List of oldest birth fathers
List of oldest birth mothers
List of people with the most children
List of multiple births
List of youngest birth fathers
Precocious puberty
Teenage pregnancy

Notes

References

Child sexual abuse
Lists of people by age
Birth mothers
Motherhood
Precocious puberty and pregnancy
Biological records
Lists of mothers